Sean Jamieson (born July 12, 1994) is a professional Canadian football offensive linemen for the Montreal Alouettes of the Canadian Football League (CFL).

University career
Jamieson played U Sports football for the Western Mustangs from 2012 to 2016. He was a CIS First Team All-Canadian in 2014 and 2015.

Professional career
Jamieson was drafted in the third round, 20th overall, in the 2016 CFL Draft by the Montreal Alouettes and signed with the team on May 25, 2016. He returned to Western University to play his final year of eligibility in 2016 and re-joined the Alouettes in 2017 where he played in his first career game against the Ottawa Redblacks in the Labour Day Classic on August 31, 2017. Jamieson played in eight regular season games during his rookie year in 2017. He played in 16 games in 2018 and then 15 games in 2019. He did not play in 2020 due to the cancellation of the 2020 CFL season. He played in eight games in 2021. Jamieson suffered a knee injury on June 23, 2022 and missed the next three games. He was activated from the six-game injured reserve list and return to action on July 28, 2022. Later in the season Jamieson was diagnosed with a torn ACL in mid-October, ending his season.

References

External links
Montreal Alouettes bio

1994 births
Canadian football offensive linemen
Western Mustangs football players
Living people
Montreal Alouettes players
Canadian football people from Winnipeg
Players of Canadian football from Manitoba